Borki may refer to:

People
Borki Predojević, a Bosnian chess Grandmaster

Places

Poland
Borki, Koło County in Greater Poland Voivodeship (west-central Poland)
Borki, Konin County in Greater Poland Voivodeship (west-central Poland)
Borki, Słupca County in Greater Poland Voivodeship (west-central Poland)
Borki, Złotów County in Greater Poland Voivodeship (west-central Poland)
Borki, Bydgoszcz County in Kuyavian-Pomeranian Voivodeship (north-central Poland)
Borki, Rypin County in Kuyavian-Pomeranian Voivodeship (north-central Poland)
Borki, Tuchola County in Kuyavian-Pomeranian Voivodeship (north-central Poland)
Borki, Lesser Poland Voivodeship (south Poland)
Borki, Brzeziny County in Łódź Voivodeship (central Poland)
Borki, Łęczyca County in Łódź Voivodeship (central Poland)
Borki, Łódź East County in Łódź Voivodeship (central Poland)
Borki, Pajęczno County in Łódź Voivodeship (central Poland)
Borki, Gmina Gidle in Łódź Voivodeship (central Poland)
Borki, Gmina Ładzice in Łódź Voivodeship (central Poland)
Borki, Gmina Masłowice in Łódź Voivodeship (central Poland)
Borki, Lower Silesian Voivodeship (south-west Poland)
Borki, Biłgoraj County in Lublin Voivodeship (east Poland)
Borki, Łuków County in Lublin Voivodeship (east Poland)
Borki, Radzyń Podlaski County in Lublin Voivodeship (east Poland)
Borki, Ryki County in Lublin Voivodeship (east Poland)
Borki, Mińsk County in Masovian Voivodeship (east-central Poland)
Borki, Ostrołęka County in Masovian Voivodeship (east-central Poland)
Borki, Gmina Sobienie-Jeziory in Masovian Voivodeship (east-central Poland)
Borki, Piaseczno County in Masovian Voivodeship (east-central Poland)
Borki, Płock County in Masovian Voivodeship (east-central Poland)
Borki, Siedlce County in Masovian Voivodeship (east-central Poland)
Borki, Sokołów County in Masovian Voivodeship (east-central Poland)
Borki, Szydłowiec County in Masovian Voivodeship (east-central Poland)
Borki, Gmina Jadów in Masovian Voivodeship (east-central Poland)
Borki, Gmina Radzymin in Masovian Voivodeship (east-central Poland)
Borki, Zwoleń County in Masovian Voivodeship (east-central Poland)
Borki, Żuromin County in Masovian Voivodeship (east-central Poland)
Borki, Opole Voivodeship (south-west Poland)
Borki, Białystok County in Podlaskie Voivodeship (north-east Poland)
Borki, Hajnówka County in Podlaskie Voivodeship (north-east Poland)
Borki, Subcarpathian Voivodeship (south-east Poland)
Borki, Jędrzejów County in Świętokrzyskie Voivodeship (south-central Poland)
Borki, Kielce County in Świętokrzyskie Voivodeship (south-central Poland)
Borki, Staszów County in Świętokrzyskie Voivodeship (south-central Poland)
Borki, Bartoszyce County in Warmian-Masurian Voivodeship (north Poland)
Borki, Działdowo County in Warmian-Masurian Voivodeship (north Poland)
Borki, Gmina Ełk in Warmian-Masurian Voivodeship (north Poland)
Borki, Gmina Prostki in Warmian-Masurian Voivodeship (north Poland)
Borki, Gmina Kruklanki in Warmian-Masurian Voivodeship (north Poland)
Borki, Gmina Miłki in Warmian-Masurian Voivodeship (north Poland)
Borki, Nowe Miasto County in Warmian-Masurian Voivodeship (north Poland)
Borki, Olecko County in Warmian-Masurian Voivodeship (north Poland)
Borki, Pisz County in Warmian-Masurian Voivodeship (north Poland)
Borki, West Pomeranian Voivodeship (north-west Poland)

Russia
 Borki, Russia, name of several rural localities in Russia

Ukraine 
 See Birky (disambiguation)